HMS E20 was a British E-class submarine built by Vickers, Barrow-in-Furness. She was laid down on 25 November 1914 and was commissioned on 30 August 1915.

Design
She was powered by two  Vickers eight-cylinder two-stroke diesel engines and two  electric motors.

E20 was fitted, possibly uniquely within her class, with a 6-inch howitzer deck gun, forward of the conning tower. She had five 18-inch (450 mm) torpedo tubes, two in the bow, one either side amidships, and one in the stern; a total of 10 torpedoes were carried.

E-class submarines had wireless systems with  power ratings; in some submarines, these were later upgraded to  systems by removing a midship torpedo tube. Their maximum design depth was  although in service some reached depths of below . Some submarines contained Fessenden oscillator systems.

Crew
Her complement was three officers and 28 men.

Loss
However, on 30 October, Turkish forces sank the Turquoise off Nagara Point in the Dardanelles, refloating her shortly afterwards, her confidential papers retrieved intact. Unaware of her plight, E20  attempted to keep the rendez-vous. The Imperial German Navy submarine UB-14, which was at Constantinople, was duly sent to intercept E20, reportedly going so far as to radio messages in the latest British code. E20s crew saw the torpedo, but it was too late to avoid the weapon. The torpedo hit E20s conning tower and sank her with the loss of 21 men. UB-14 rescued nine,  including E20s captain who, reportedly, had been brushing his teeth at the time of the attack.

References

External links
 'Submarine losses 1904 to present day' - Royal Navy Submarine Museum 

 

British E-class submarines of the Royal Navy
Ships built in Barrow-in-Furness
1915 ships
World War I submarines of the United Kingdom
Ships sunk by German submarines in World War I
Maritime incidents in Turkey
Shipwrecks in the Sea of Marmara
Royal Navy ship names
Maritime incidents in 1915